Cruthers is a surname. Notable people with the surname include:

James Cruthers (1924–2015), Australian businessman and philanthropist
Press Cruthers (1890–1976), American baseball player
Ryan Cruthers (born 1984), American ice hockey player and coach